Alfred Hansen (10 May 1913 – 21 July 1995) was a Danish footballer. He played in four matches for the Denmark national football team from 1937 to 1940.

References

External links
 

1913 births
1995 deaths
Danish men's footballers
Denmark international footballers
Place of birth missing
Association footballers not categorized by position